Glynis Jones may refer to:
Glynis Jones (composer), British composer
Glynis Jones (archaeologist), British archaeologist